John James Mason (4 February 1842 – 15 June 1903) was mayor of Hamilton, Ontario from 1884 to 1885.

References 
 

1842 births
1903 deaths
Mayors of Hamilton, Ontario

Canadian Militia officers
Royal Hamilton Light Infantry (Wentworth Regiment) officers